Rhynchina revolutalis is a moth of the  subfamily Hypeninae. It can be found in most parts of Africa and in the Middle East

References

External links
 Swedish Museum of Natural History - picture of the typus

Moths described in 1852
Owlet moths of Africa
Moths of Madagascar
Moths of Africa
Moths of Réunion